Members of the King's Privy Council for Canada use the title The Honourable if they are ordinary members. Prime Ministers, Governors General and Chief Justices automatically are given the title The Right Honourable. While Governors General have the right to the title Right Honourable upon being sworn into office they are not inducted into the Privy Council until the end of their term unless they were previously members of the council by virtue of another office. Other eminent individuals such as prominent former Cabinet ministers are sometimes also given the title Right Honourable. Leaders of opposition parties and provincial premiers are not automatically inducted into the Privy Council. Opposition leaders are brought in from time to time either to commemorate a special event such as the Canadian Centennial in 1967, the patriation of the Constitution or, in order to allow them to be advised on sensitive issues of national security under the Security of Information Act. Paul Martin inaugurated a practice of inducting parliamentary secretaries into the Privy Council but this has not been continued by his successors.

Current members of the King's Privy Council for Canada (year sworn in)

Former governors general
The Right Honourable Edward Schreyer (1984)
The Right Honourable Adrienne Clarkson (2005)
The Right Honourable Michaëlle Jean (2012)
The Right Honourable David Johnston (2018)

Current and former prime ministers
The Right Honourable Jean Chrétien (1967)
The Right Honourable Joe Clark (1979)
The Right Honourable Brian Mulroney (1984)
The Right Honourable Kim Campbell (1989)
The Right Honourable Paul Martin (1993)
The Right Honourable Stephen Harper (2004)
The Right Honourable Justin Trudeau (2015)

Current and former Chief Justices of Canada
The Right Honourable Beverley McLachlin (2000)
The Right Honourable Richard Wagner (2017)

Current and former Cabinet ministers (by prime minister at induction)

Lester Pearson
The Right Honourable Jean Chrétien (1967)

Pierre Trudeau
 The Honourable Otto Emil Lang (1968)
 The Honourable André Ouellet (1972)
 The Honourable Marc Lalonde (1972)
 The Honourable J. Judd Buchanan (1974)
 The Honourable Marcel Lessard (1975)
 The Honourable Monique Bégin (1976)
 The Honourable Jean-Jacques Blais (1976)
 The Honourable Francis Fox (1976)
 The Honourable Anthony Chisholm Abbott (1976)
 The Honourable Iona Campagnolo (1976)

Joe Clark
 The Honourable David Samuel Horne MacDonald (1979)
 The Honourable Elmer MacIntosh MacKay (1979)
 The Honourable Arthur Jacob Epp (1979)
 The Honourable John Allen Fraser (1979)
 The Honourable David Crombie (1979)
 The Honourable Henry Perrin Beatty (1979)

Pierre Trudeau (second ministry)
 The Honourable Charles Lapointe (1980)
 The Honourable Edward C. Lumley (1980)
 The Honourable Yvon Pinard (1980)
 The Honourable Lloyd Axworthy (1980)
 The Honourable Paul James Cosgrove (1980)
 The Honourable Judith A. Erola (1980)
 The Honourable Jacob Austin (1981)
 The Honourable Serge Joyal (1981)
 The Honourable David Collenette (1983)
 The Honourable Céline Hervieux-Payette (1983)
 The Honourable Roger Simmons (1983)
 The Honourable Roy MacLaren (1983)
 The Honourable Joseph Mario Jacques Olivier (1984)

John Turner
 The Honourable Herb Breau (1984)
 The Honourable Joseph Roger Rémi Bujold (1984)

Brian Mulroney
 The Honourable Jack Burnett Murta (1984)
 The Honourable Otto Jelinek (1984)
 The Honourable Thomas Edward Siddon (1984)
 The Honourable Charles James Mayer (1984)
 The Honourable Walter Franklin McLean (1984)
 The Honourable Thomas McMillan (1984)
 The Honourable Patricia Carney (1984)
 The Honourable André Bissonnette (1984)
 The Honourable Benoît Bouchard (1984)
 The Honourable Michel Côté (1984)
 The Honourable Barbara McDougall (1984)
 The Honourable Monique Vézina (1984)
 The Honourable Frank Oberle, Sr. (1985)
 The Honourable Lowell Murray (1986)
 The Honourable Pierre H. Cadieux (1986)
 The Honourable Jean Charest (1986)
 The Honourable Thomas Hockin (1986)
 The Honourable Monique Landry (1986)
 The Honourable Bernard Valcourt (1986)
 The Honourable Gerry Weiner (1986)
 The Honourable Douglas Grinslade Lewis (1987)
 The Honourable Pierre Blais (1987)
 The Honourable Lucien Bouchard (1988)
 The Honourable Gerry St. Germain (1988)
 The Honourable John Horton McDermid (1988)
 The Right Honourable Kim Campbell (1989)
 The Honourable Mary Collins (1989)
 The Honourable Alan Redway (1989)
 The Honourable Marcel Danis (1990)
 The Honourable Pauline Browes (1991)
 The Honourable Pierre H. Vincent (1993)

Kim Campbell
 The Honourable Jim Edwards (1993)
 The Honourable Robert Douglas Nicholson (1993)
 The Honourable Barbara Jane Sparrow (1993)
 The Honourable Peter McCreath (1993)
 The Honourable Ian Angus Ross Reid (1993)
 The Honourable Larry Schneider (1993)
 The Honourable Garth Turner (1993)

Jean Chrétien
 The Honourable David Anderson (1993)
 The Honourable Ralph Goodale (1993)
 The Honourable David Dingwall (1993)
 The Honourable Brian Tobin (1993)
 The Honourable Sheila Copps (1993)
 The Honourable Sergio Marchi (1993)
 The Honourable John Manley (1993)
 The Honourable Douglas Young (1993)
 The Honourable Michel Dupuy (1993)
 The Honourable Art Eggleton (1993)
 The Honourable Marcel Massé (1993)
 The Honourable Anne McLellan (1993)
 The Honourable Allan Rock (1993)
 The Honourable Ethel Blondin-Andrew (1993)
 The Honourable Lawrence MacAulay (1993)
 The Honourable Raymond Chan (1993)
 The Honourable Fernand Robichaud (1993)
 The Honourable Jon Gerrard (1993)
 The Honourable Lucienne Robillard (1995)
 The Honourable Jane Stewart (1996)
 The Honourable Stéphane Dion (1996)
 The Honourable Pierre Pettigrew (1996)
 The Honourable Martin Cauchon (1996)
 The Honourable Don Boudria (1996)
 The Honourable Hedy Fry (1996)
 The Honourable Lyle Vanclief (1997)
 The Honourable Herb Dhaliwal (1997)
 The Honourable Jim Peterson (1997)
 The Honourable Andy Mitchell (1997)
 The Honourable Gilbert Normand (1997)
 The Honourable George Baker (1999)
 The Honourable Robert Daniel Nault (1999)
 The Honourable Maria Minna (1999)
 The Honourable Elinor Caplan (1999)
 The Honourable Denis Coderre (1999)
 The Honourable Bernard Boudreau (1999)
 The Honourable Sharon Carstairs (2001)
 The Honourable Robert Thibault (2001)
 The Honourable Rey Pagtakhan (2001)
 The Honourable Susan Whelan (2002)
 The Honourable Gar Knutson (2002)
 The Honourable Denis Paradis (2002)
 The Honourable John McCallum (2002)
 The Honourable Stephen Owen (2002)
 The Honourable Gerry Byrne (2002)
 The Honourable Jean Augustine (2002)
 The Honourable Wayne Easter (2002)
 The Honourable Maurizio Bevilacqua (2002)
 The Honourable Paul DeVillers (2002)
 The Honourable Claude Drouin (2002)
 The Honourable Steven W. Mahoney (2003)

Paul Martin
 The Honourable Albina Guarnieri (2003)
 The Honourable Stan Kazmierczak Keyes (2003)
 The Honourable Joseph McGuire (2003)
 The Honourable Geoff Regan	(2003)
 The Honourable Tony Valeri (2003)
 The Honourable David Pratt (2003)
 The Honourable Irwin Cotler	(2003)
 The Honourable Judy Sgro	(2003)
 The Honourable Hélène Chalifour Scherrer (2003)
 The Honourable Liza Frulla (2003)
 The Honourable Joe Volpe (2003)
 The Honourable Carolyn Bennett (2003)
 The Honourable Jacques Saada (2003)
 The Honourable Joe Fontana (2003)
 The Honourable John Godfrey (2003)
 The Honourable Scott Brison (2003)
 The Honourable Ujjal Dosanjh (2004)
 The Honourable Ken Dryden (2004)
 The Honourable David Emerson (2004)
 The Honourable Tony Ianno (2004)
 The Honourable Belinda Stronach (2005)

Stephen Harper
The Honourable Jean-Pierre Blackburn (2006)	
The Honourable Marjory LeBreton (2006)
The Honourable Monte Solberg (2006)
The Honourable Chuck Strahl (2006)
The Honourable Gary Lunn (2006)
The Honourable Peter Gordon MacKay	(2006)
The Honourable Loyola Hearn	(2006)
The Honourable Stockwell Day	(2006)
The Honourable Carol Skelton	(2006)
The Honourable Vic Toews	(2006)
The Honourable Rona Ambrose	(2006)
The Honourable Michael D. Chong	(2006)
The Honourable Diane Finley	(2006)
The Honourable Gordon O'Connor	(2006)
The Honourable Beverley J. Oda	(2006)
The Honourable John Baird	(2006)
The Honourable Maxime Bernier	(2006)
The Honourable Lawrence Cannon	(2006)
The Honourable Tony Clement	(2006)
The Honourable Josée Verner	(2006)
The Honourable Michael Fortier	(2006)
The Honourable John Reynolds	(2006)
The Honourable Peter Van Loan	(2006)
The Honourable Jay Hill (2006)
The Honourable Jason Kenney	(2007)
The Honourable Gerry Ritz	(2007)
The Honourable Helena Guergis	(2007)
The Honourable Christian Paradis	(2007)
The Honourable Diane Ablonczy	(2007)
The Honourable James Moore	(2008)
The Honourable Leona Aglukkaq	(2008)
The Honourable Steven John Fletcher	(2008)
The Honourable Gary Goodyear	(2008)
The Honourable Peter Kent	(2008)
The Honourable Denis Lebel	(2008)
The Honourable Rob Merrifield	(2008)
The Honourable Lisa Raitt	(2008)
The Honourable Gail Shea	(2008)
The Honourable Lynne Yelich	(2008)
The Honourable Rob Moore	(2010)
The Honourable John Duncan	(2010)
The Honourable Julian Fantino (2011)
The Honourable Ted Menzies	(2011)
The Honourable Steven Blaney	(2011)
The Honourable Edward Fast	(2011)
The Honourable Joe Oliver	(2011)
The Honourable Peter Penashue	(2011)
The Honourable Tim Uppal	(2011)
The Honourable Alice Wong	(2011)
The Honourable Bal Gosal (2011)
The Honourable Kerry-Lynne D. Findlay	(2013)
The Honourable Shelly Glover (2013)
The Honourable Chris Alexander (2013)
The Honourable Khristinn Kellie Leitch (2013)
The Honourable Kevin Sorenson (2013)
The Honourable Pierre Poilievre (2013)
The Honourable Candice Bergen (2013)
The Honourable Greg Rickford (2013)
The Honourable Michelle Rempel	(2013)
The Honourable Ed Holder	(2014)
The Honourable Erin O'Toole (2015)

Justin Trudeau
The Honourable Dominic LeBlanc (2004) 
The Honourable Navdeep Singh Bains (2005) 
The Honourable William Francis Morneau	(2015)
The Honourable Jody Wilson-Raybould	(2015)
The Honourable Judy M. Foote	(2015)
The Honourable Chrystia Freeland	(2015)
The Honourable Jane Philpott	(2015)
The Honourable Jean-Yves Duclos	(2015)
The Honourable Marc Garneau	(2015)
The Honourable Marie-Claude Bibeau	(2015)
The Honourable Mélanie Joly (2015)
The Honourable Diane Lebouthillier	(2015)
The Honourable Kent Hehr	        (2015)
The Honourable Catherine McKenna	(2015)
The Honourable Harjit Singh Sajjan	(2015)
The Honourable MaryAnn Mihychuk	(2015)
The Honourable Amarjeet Sohi	(2015)
The Honourable Maryam Monsef	(2015)
The Honourable Carla Qualtrough	(2015)
The Honourable Hunter Tootoo	(2015)
The Honourable Kirsty Duncan	(2015)
The Honourable Patricia A. Hajdu	(2015)
The Honourable Bardish Chagger	(2015)
The Honourable Ginette Petitpas Taylor (2016) 
The Honourable François-Philippe Champagne	(2017)
The Honourable Karina Gould (2017)
The Honourable Ahmed Hussen (2017)
The Honourable Seamus O'Regan (2017)
The Honourable David McGuinty (2018)
The Honourable William Sterling Blair (2018)
The Honourable Mary Ng (2018)
The Honourable Filomena Tassi (2018)
The Honourable Jonathan Wilkinson (2018)
The Honourable David Lametti (2019)
The Honourable Bernadette Jordan (2019)
The Honourable Joyce Murray (2019)
The Honourable Marco E.L. Mendicino (2019)
The Honourable Steven Guilbeault (2019)
The Honourable Anita Anand (2019)
The Honourable Mona Fortier (2019)
The Honourable Marc Miller (2019)
The Honourable Deborah Schulte (2019)
The Honourable Daniel Vandal (2019)
The Honourable Randy Boissonnault (2021)
The Honourable  Sean Fraser (2021)
The Honourable Gudie Hutchings (2021) 
The Honourable Marci Ien (2021)
The Honourable Helena Jaczek (2021)
The Honourable Kamal Khera (2021)
The Honourable Pascale St-Onge (2021)
(all those listed joined the Privy Council as Cabinet ministers unless otherwise indicated)

Other parliamentarians (not otherwise listed above)

Former Speakers of the House of Commons
 The Honourable Peter Milliken (2012)

Former Speakers of the Senate
 The Honourable Dan Hays (2007)
 The Honourable Noël Kinsella (2015)

Current and former government representatives/leaders in the Senate (who were not cabinet ministers)
 The Honourable Claude Carignan (2013)
 The Honourable V. Peter Harder (2016)
 The Honourable Marc Gold (2020)

Current and former federal Leaders of His Majesty's Loyal Opposition
 The Honourable Grant Hill (2004)
 The Honourable Michael Ignatieff (2010)
 The Honourable Thomas Mulcair (2012)
 The Honourable Preston Manning (2013)
 The Honourable Deborah Grey (2013)
 The Honourable Andrew Scheer (2017)

Other former party leaders
 The Honourable Ed Broadbent (1982)
 The Honourable Audrey McLaughlin (1991)
 The Honourable Bob Rae (1998)

Current and former Chief Government Whips (who were not cabinet ministers)
The Honourable Karen Redman (2004)
The Honourable Andrew Leslie (2016)
The Honourable Pablo Rodríguez (2017)
The Honourable Mark Holland (2018)
The Honourable Steven MacKinnon (2021)

Members of Parliament appointed by nature of being parliamentary secretaries (appointed 2003–2005, only period where all parliamentary secretaries are sworn into Privy Council)
 The Honourable John McKay (2003)
 The Honourable Gurbax Malhi (2003)
 The Honourable Larry Bagnell (2003)
 The Honourable Brenda Chamberlain (2003)
 The Honourable Walt Lastewka (2003)
 The Honourable Dan McTeague (2003)
 The Honourable Mark Eyking (2003)
 The Honourable Georges Farrah (2003)
 The Honourable Eleni Bakopanos (2003)
 The Honourable Paul Bonwick (2003)
 The Honourable Joseph Louis Jordan (2003)
 The Honourable Shawn Murphy (2003)
 The Honourable Jim Karygiannis (2003)
 The Honourable David Price (2003)
 The Honourable Roger Gallaway (2003)
 The Honourable Susan Barnes (2003)
 The Honourable André Harvey (2003)
 The Honourable Roy Cullen (2004)
 The Honourable Marlene Jennings (2004)
 The Honourable Judi Longfield (2004)
 The Honourable Paul Harold Macklin (2004)
 The Honourable Patricia Anne Torsney (2004)
 The Honourable Bryon Wilfert (2004)
 The Honourable Sarmite Bulte (2004)

Other current and former parliamentarians
 The Honourable Lorne Nystrom (1992)
 The Honourable Raymond Speaker (1999)
 The Honourable Frances Lankin (2009)
 The Honourable Rick Casson (2010)
 The Honourable Laurie Hawn (2010)
 The Honourable Ron Cannan (2012)
 The Honourable Mike Lake (2012)
 The Honourable Gerald Comeau (2013)
 The Honourable Omar Alghabra (2020)
 The Honourable Greg Fergus (2021)
 The Honourable Rob Oliphant (2021)

Current and former provincial premiers (not otherwise listed above)
 The Honourable Alexander B. Campbell (1967)
 The Honourable Brian Peckford (1982)
 The Honourable James Matthew Lee (1982)
 The Honourable David Peterson (1992)
 The Honourable Frank McKenna (1999)
 The Honourable Gary Filmon (2001)
 The Honourable Roy Romanow (2003)
 The Honourable Philippe Couillard (2010)

Former Clerks of the Privy Council
 The Honourable Paul M. Tellier (1992)
 The Honourable Jocelyne Bourgon (1998)
 The Honourable Kevin G. Lynch (2009)
The Honourable Wayne G. Wouters (2014)
The Honourable Ian Shugart (2022)

Former members of the Security Intelligence Review Committee (not otherwise listed above)
 The Honourable J. J. Michel Robert (1991)
 The Honourable Jim Grant (1996)
 The Honourable Baljit Singh Chadha (2003)
 The Honourable Aldéa Landry (2005)
 The Honourable Denis Losier (2008)
 The Honourable L. Yves Fortier (2013)
 The Honourable Cyril Eugene McLean (2014)
 The Honourable Ian Carl Holloway (2015)
 The Honourable Marie-Lucie Morin (2015)

The Canadian Security Intelligence Service Act established the Security Intelligence Review Committee, and required members to be named from members of the King's Privy Council who were not members of the Senate or House of Commons at the time of their appointment. As such, appointees, if not already members of the Privy Council, were sworn in prior to being named to the committee. In 2019, the SIRC was replaced by the National Security and Intelligence Review Agency.

Other prominent Canadians
 The Honourable John C. Polanyi (1992)
 The Honourable Richard Cashin (1992)
 The Honourable Antonine Maillet (1992)
 The Honourable Charles Bronfman (1992)

While traditionally appointment to the Order of Canada has been utilised to recognize prominent Canadians, Brian Mulroney appointed 18 Canadians to the Privy Council on Canada Day in 1992 in commemoration of Canada's 125th anniversary, and two more (the late W.O. Mitchell and Maurice Richard) later that year. The appointments were somewhat controversial and have yet to be repeated. Conrad Black, who was one of the 18 appointed, was expelled from the Privy Council in 2014 on the recommendation of Prime Minister Stephen Harper.

Longest-serving current Privy Counsellors
This is a list of the longest-serving current members of the King's Privy Council for Canada.

See also
Lists of historical members of the Privy Council for Canada

Notes

References

External links
  Official list of Privy Councillors.

King's Privy Council
 Current